John Russell (fl. 1410) of Wells, Somerset, was an English politician.

Family
His wife was named Alice and they probably had two sons, names unknown. After Russell's death, Alice married another Wells MP, Robert Elwell.

Career
Russell was an attorney and tax controller. He was a Member (MP) of the Parliament of England for Wells in 1410.

References

14th-century births
15th-century deaths
English MPs 1410
People from Wells, Somerset